Sainte-Trie is a commune in the Dordogne department in Nouvelle-Aquitaine in southwestern France.

History
During the creation of the French departments in 1790, the commune first became part of the Corrèze department. It became part of the Dordogne department in 1793.

Population

See also
Communes of the Dordogne department

References

Communes of Dordogne
Arrondissement of Périgueux